SS Mary was a Design 1022 cargo ship built for the United States Shipping Board immediately after World War I.

History
She was laid down at yard number 1535 at the Philadelphia, Pennsylvania shipyard of the American International Shipbuilding Corporation, one of 110 Design 1022 cargo ships built for the United States Shipping Board. She was completed in 1920 and named Cody. In 1930, she was purchased by Tampa Interocean Steamship Company. In 1939, she was purchased by Bull-Insular Steamship Company (A.H. Bull & Co) and renamed SS Mary. On March 3, 1942, she was torpedoed and sunk by German submarine U-129, 250 miles northeast of Paramaribo, Suriname. Survivors were picked up by the freighter SS Alcoa Scout.

References

Bibliography

External links
 EFC Design 1022: Illustrations

1920 ships
Ships built in Philadelphia
Merchant ships of the United States
Maritime incidents in February 1942
Maritime incidents in March 1942
Ships sunk by German submarines in World War II
Design 1022 ships